Kevin Thompson may refer to:

 Kevin Thompson (baseball) (born 1979), Major League Baseball player
 Kevin Thompson (basketball) (born 1971), American former basketball player
 Kevin Thompson (pastor) (born 1958), pastor from San Leandro, California convicted of shark smuggling
 Kevin Thompson (American football) (born 1977), former starting quarterback for Penn State Nittany Lions
 Kevin Thompson (karate) (born 1962)
 Kevin Rolland Thompson, physicist
 Kevin Thompson (Daria), a fictional character on the MTV show Daria
 Kevin Thompson, the real name for Jessica Jones villain Purple Man in the TV series of the same name

See also
 Kevin Thomson (born 1984), Scottish footballer
 Kevin Thomson (cricketer) (born 1971), Scottish cricketer